The Chairman Dances is a ballet made by New York City Ballet ballet master in chief Peter Martins to John Adams' eponymous music from 1985. The music was originally written for Adams' opera, Nixon in China, but not used in production: the scene is that in which Mao Zedong dances with his future bride, movie star Chiang Ch'ing. The premiere took place on 14 May 1988, as part of City Ballet's American Music Festival at New York State Theater, Lincoln Center, with scenery and costumes by Rouben Ter-Arutunian, and lighting by Mark Stanley.

Original cast
Darci Kistler

See also
 List of historical ballet characters

References  
Playbill, New York City Ballet, Saturday, May 10, 2008
Repertory Week, New York City Ballet, Spring Season, 2008 repertory, week 2

External links  
NY Times review by Anna Kisselgoff, May 16, 1988
NY Times review by Anna Kisselgoff, May 17, 1988
NY Times review by Jennifer Dunning, January 23, 1997
NY Times review by Alastair Macaulay, February 9, 2008

Ballets by Peter Martins
Ballets by John Adams (composer)
1988 ballet premieres
Ballets designed by Rouben Ter-Arutunian
New York City Ballet American Music Festival
New York City Ballet repertory